In Your Hands is the second studio album by British singer Eliza Doolittle. It was released by Parlophone on 14 October 2013 in the United Kingdom. The album peaked at number 25 on the UK Albums Chart and number 71 on the Irish Albums Chart.

Critical reception

Allmusic editor Matt Collar found that the album "goes far toward moving her in a more grown-up direction. Working with a handful of writer/producers, In Your Hands is a sophisticated, contemporary dance and soul album that takes its cues from the sound and style of '90s R&B stars like Mariah Carey and En Vogue [...] Ultimately, the focus on In Your Hands is less on Doolittle's cheeky persona and more on her passionate lyrics and warm vocals, a change she can back up with her creativity and talent." Robert Copsey of Digital Spy called In Your Hands a "coming of age record" that is "a recollection of experiences that come with being in a serious relationship." He felt that "all too often [Doolittle] slips into MOR soul-pop, adding little new – musically or otherwise – to the table. It seems in an effort to be taken seriously, Eliza has forgotten to have any fun." Renowned for Sound critic Francesca Tichon remarked that "though people have compared her to Lily Allen, and her soulful voice does conjure memories of Amy Winehouse, Doolittle falls far short of these two musical icons. Her sound is a fairly generic UK pop sound, and though In Your Hands is a fun album with relatable story lines (and certainly a vast improvement on her debut), it’s really nothing special."

Commercial performance
On 16 October 2013, the album debuted at number 23 on The Official Chart Update. A day later, In Your Hands entered the Irish Albums Chart at number 71. On 20 October 2013, the album entered the UK Albums Chart at number 25.

Track listing

Charts

Release history

References

2013 albums
Eliza Doolittle (singer) albums
Parlophone albums
Albums produced by Kwes